Business Center has several meanings or usage.

Places
 Central business district or Commercial district
 ABA Business Center, the tallest building in Tirana, Albania
 Abbey business centres, UK
 City Business Center, Bratislava
 East Pacific Center, skyscraper complex in China (nearing completion in  2013)
 Gårda Business Center, Sweden
 International Business Center, planned supertall building in Korea
 Jumeirah Business Center 1, 46-floor tower in Dubai (proposed)
 Millennium Business Center, Romania
 National Business Center, US
 Parus Business Centre
 Templeton Business Centre, Glasgow
 Vojvodina Sports and Business Center, Serbia
 serviced office

Television
 A syndicated television show, Business Center, distributed in several regions around the world:
 Business Centre Europe
 Business Centre Australia
 Business Center (CNBC Asia)

Computing
 Nokia Business Center